Professor Works Laboratory Vol. 1 is an eight track EP by American rapper Chucky Workclothes. It was released by his label Team Insomniac on December 28, 2015. The EP is part of a three part series with the second installment scheduled to be released early Fall 2016. The EP was supported by the singles "Sir Charles" and "Team Insomniac".

Track listing

References

External links 
 Professor Works Laboratory, Vol. 1 on iTunes. 
 Professor Works Laboratory, Vol. 1 on Amazon.

Chucky Workclothes albums
2015 EPs
Self-released EPs